Of the Flesh is a 1983 Philippine drama film directed by Marilou Diaz-Abaya. It was adapted and written by Ricky Lee from the legal story "To Take a Life" by Teresa Añover Rodriguez and produced by Benjamin G. Yalung. It sets in the 1930s during the American colonial era and it tells the story of a newly-wed couple Narcing (Phillip Salvador) and Puring (Cecille Castillo) arrived from Manila in the town of Mulawin, a place where it was filled with violent and tragic pasts and it has been similarized to Hell by the Storyteller, played by Charito Solis. As they arrive, they will witness all of the misfortunes and violent actions as it tackles rape, incest, parricide, and tyranny that has been tainted in the town's heart by the cruel man Gusting (Vic Silayan).

It was filmed in the provinces of Nueva Ecija and Rizal and the National Capital Region. Ryan Cayabyab provided the musical score for the film and Manolo Abaya, the director's husband, served as the director of photography. It is the last film of Marilou Diaz-Abaya's trilogy of feminist films, among them are Brutal (1980) and Moral (1982). These films depicted the feminist issues and concerns, complete with the use of backdrops and metaphors related to the Martial Law era.

The film was selected as the Philippine entry for the Best Foreign Language Film at the 57th Academy Awards, but was not accepted as a nominee. The film has received its overseas release in the United Kingdom on November 23, 1984, as part of the London Film Festival and in Japan on September 14, 2001, as part of the Special Feature of Marilou Diaz-Abaya at the 2001 Fukuoka International Film Festival along with the other films she had previously directed.

In 2015, the film was digitally restored and remastered in high-definition by the ABS-CBN Film Restoration under the leadership of Leonardo P. Katigbak and Central Digital Lab under Rick Hawthorne and Manet Dayrit. The restored version of Karnal was premiered on August 13, 2015, as one of the special features for the 11th Cinemalaya Independent Film Festival.

Plot 
A middle-aged woman (Charito Solis), acting as the narrator, tells a long but violent and tragic story about her mother's life in the town which is only one step ahead of Hell. She also mentions the lives of the townspeople living under the rule of a tyrannical and violent landowner.

The newlyweds Narcing (Phillip Salvador) and Puring (Cecille Castillo) arrived from Manila, the capital, to live in the hometown of the Mulawin where Narcing was born and raised. His father, Gusting (Vic Silayan), was taken aback by Puring's resemblance to his deceased wife Elena. The analogy prompted Gusting to sacrifice his daughter-in-law. He made an advance gesture toward Puring, showing his anger by motivating Narcing to be more assertive. At the same time, he had to lay bare the villagers in his friendship with a deaf man Gorio (Joel Torre). In the violent family conflict that ensued, Narcing attacked his father with a long shot, hunting him out of the way.

While her husband is in jail, Puring gives birth to a demon-possessed infant, considered by the town's villagers. After burying her daughter in the burning fields, Narcing escaped from prison but the authorities were pursuing to capture him. As he found his wife at Gorio's hut, Narcing, along with Puring, escapes in order to avoid being captured by the authorities. Unfortunately for him, Narcing was captured by the authorities but his hands were tied by a rope and he was repeatedly stumbled and slid to the ground as Puring emotionally cries when she watches the tragedy. Moments later as the jail warden opens his cell, he found out that Narcing committed suicide by slitting his throat with a sharp object. The news of his death leads to Puring being devastated and emotionally cried in shock.

The narrator revealed her identity as the niece of Narcing and Puring. Her mother Doray (Grace Amilbangsa) was Narcing's sister. Forcing his father to marry he did not want to, Doray flees from the family home to be with his true love Jose. Likewise, she was also a victim of family violence in the past. On the other hand, Puring returns to Manila to work as a dispatcher again but according to the others' accounts, she became even worse when she became a prostitute to the Americans in the dark areas of the capital where she forcefully spoke English to them and some said, she became a nun where she forgave her sins that she committed. However, these rumors will never be confirmed and her true whereabouts will remain a mystery.

Cast
Charito Solis as the storyteller
Phillip Salvador as Narcing
Vic Silayan as Gusting
Cecille Castillo as Puring
Joel Torre as Goryo
Grace Amilbangsa as Doray
Crispin Medina as Menardo
Joonee Gamboa as Pekto
Rolando Tinio as Bino
Ella Luansing as Suling
Vangie Labalan as Rosing
Gil de Leon as Padre Julian
Rustica Carpio as Talia

Production

Pre-production

The production of Karnal began when director Marilou Diaz-Abaya received a mysterious telephone call who was under the name "M-7", telling her if she agrees to do another film project. Since the person from the call was mysterious, the publicist informed the director that the caller was no other than film producer Benjamin G. Yalung and "M-7" is his alias. Soon after, Marilou Diaz-Abaya, accompanied by her husband Manolo Abaya, met Ben Yalung at a dinner in the restaurant and his friend, actress Cecille Castillo who was previously starred in Lino Brocka's Cain at Abel (1982), was also invited. During the middle of their meeting, the producer handed a magazine clipping to the director. The clipping was a legal story by Teresita Añover-Rodriguez, To Take A Life, which was published through Mr. & Ms. Magazine and tells the story of a woman who killed her father-in-law who raped her abusively. Yalung told Diaz-Abaya a condition to create a film where Cecille Castillo is one of the starring cast. Because of the story, director Diaz-Abaya was struck by Castillo's period-style looks, believing that she is perfect for the film project.

Ricky Lee, the director's screenwriting collaborator in her previous two films, began to create a screenplay after he was informed of Cecille Castillo's perfect period-era looks and the legal story by Añover-Rodriguez as its basis, both were told by Abaya. The director felt that the story would be set earlier in the 1930s in which she believed that the morals and attitudes of the said era began to transition from the old conservative of the Spanish era to liberalism due to the influence of the American colonial rule.

Filming and production design
Fiel Zabat, the film's production designer, first studied the old paintings that were still hanged at the house of Diaz-Abaya's parents to get the period-era feeling. She also studied the paintings of Fernando Amorsolo and reading the reference materials related to the said painter. For the film's shooting, Marilou Diaz-Abaya and Fiel Zabat began searching towns in Central Luzon that would serve as a potential filming place for the film. As a result, they chose the town of Gapan in Nueva Ecija and its surrounding towns as the decided shooting site for the film. Luckily for the film's staff and crew, the old stone house that the director fell in love with was actually owned by the production designer's distant aunt in which she welcomed the director and the others as a family. As a result, the house became one of the filming sites. Several of the old and genuine period-era costumes used for the film were borrowed from Zabat's grandmothers.

Restoration 
The film's restoration was handled by the ABS-CBN Film Restoration and Central Digital Lab in Makati. According to ABS-CBN Film Archives head Leo P. Katigbak, the restoration of Karnal was discontinued when technicians spotted some defects in its acquired copy. Prior to the film's restoration, the majority of its rights are owned by ABS-CBN and they have to acquire the remaining rights to continue the restoration. The film was eventually restored in 2015 using a print generated from the original negatives and it is the first film of Diaz-Abaya to be digitally restored.

The film's restored version was premiered on August 13, 2015, at the Tanghalang Aurelio Tolentino (CCP Little Theatre) of the Cultural Center of the Philippines. The premiere was attended by the film's stars Phillip Salvador, Vangie Labalan, and Cecille Castillo; the director's two sons, musician Marc and cinematographer David Abaya; the film's cinematographer and the director's husband Manolo Abaya, and the writer Ricky Lee. Directors Antoinette Jadaone and Dan Villegas also attended the film's premiere.

Television release
The film's restored version was premiered on November 5, 2017, as a feature presentation for ABS-CBN's Sunday late-night presentation program, Sunday's Best. The televised showing was rated SPG (Strong Parental Guidance) with warnings of themes, violence, and sex by the MTRCB and attained a nationwide share rating of 0.9%, winning against GMA Network's telecast of Diyos at Bayan, which attained a 0.5% rating, according to AGB Nielsen's Nationwide Urban Television Audience Measurement (NUTAM) ratings.

Accolades

Notes

See also
 Kisapmata

References

External links

1983 films
1983 drama films
Philippine drama films
Tagalog-language films
Films directed by Marilou Diaz-Abaya